Dean Clement Melanson (born November 19, 1973) is a Canadian retired professional ice hockey defenceman. He played 9 games in the National Hockey League with the Buffalo Sabres and Washington Capitals between 1995 and 2001. The rest of his career, which lasted from 1993 to 2008, was spent in the minor leagues and in Europe.

Biography
Melanson was born in Antigonish, Nova Scotia. As a youth, he played in the 1985 and 1986 Quebec International Pee-Wee Hockey Tournaments with a minor ice hockey team from Antigonish.

Melanson was drafted in the fourth round, 80th overall, by the Buffalo Sabres in the 1992 NHL Entry Draft. Melanson appeared in only nine games in the NHL: five with the Sabres in the 1994–95 season and four with the Washington Capitals in the 2001–02 season. In his brief NHL career, Melanson went scoreless and recorded eight penalty minutes.

The majority of his professional career was spent in the American Hockey League, where he won the Calder Cup in 1996 with the Rochester Americans. He also suited up for teams in the International Hockey League, Germany's Deutsche Eishockey Liga, the Ligue Nord-Américaine de Hockey and the United Hockey League. He also had a spell in Italy for the Milano Vipers. Melanson ended his professional career after playing 11 games with British Elite Ice Hockey League team the Basingstoke Bison in the 2007–08 season.

Career statistics

Regular season and playoffs

References

External links
 

1973 births
Living people
Binghamton Senators players
Basingstoke Bison players
Buffalo Sabres draft picks
Buffalo Sabres players
Canadian expatriate ice hockey players in England
Canadian expatriate ice hockey players in Germany
Canadian expatriate ice hockey players in Italy
Canadian ice hockey defencemen
Canadian people of Acadian descent
Chicago Wolves (IHL) players
HC Milano players
Ice hockey people from Nova Scotia
Iserlohn Roosters players
Kassel Huskies players
Muskegon Fury players
People from Antigonish, Nova Scotia
Philadelphia Phantoms players
Portland Pirates players
Quebec Rafales players
Rochester Americans players
Saint-Hyacinthe Laser players
Washington Capitals players